L'Étang-la-Ville is a commune in the Yvelines department in the Île-de-France in north-central France.

Geography
L'Étang-la-Ville is served by two railway stations on the Transilien Line L: L'Étang-la-Ville and Saint-Nom-la-Bretèche–Forêt de Marly.

Demography 
The inhabitants of L'Etang-la-ville are called Stagnovillois. The population in 2019 was 4,453. The average salary is 50 000 €. It is currently France's 12th richest town income wise.

History

The town was once called "Guilbert l'Amaury". It was in 1686 that Louis XIV of France, passing during his Sunday walk from the Château de Marly gave the city its present name. It is said he declared: "This city's atmosphere is perfect to laugh, we shall re-name it!" ''.

See also
Communes of the Yvelines department

References

Communes of Yvelines